is a Japanese manga version of Murasaki Shikibu's The Tale of Genji by Miyako Maki. In 1989, it received the 34th Shogakukan Manga Award for general manga.

See also
List of characters from The Tale of Genji
The Tale of Genji - Waki Yamato's 1980-1993 manga adaptation of the tale.

References 

Maki Miyako  volume 1 Shogakukan 1997/11/17ISBN 4091912117
Maki Miyako  volume 2 Shogakukan 1998/01/17 
Maki Miyako  volume 3 Shogakukan 1998/01/17 
Maki Miyako  volume 4 Shogakukan 1998/02/17 
Maki Miyako  volume 5 Shogakukan 1998/02/17 
Maki Miyako  volume 6 Shogakukan 1998/04/17 
源氏物語(小学館文庫) Shogakukan Online

Manga based on novels
Shogakukan manga
Winners of the Shogakukan Manga Award for general manga
manga maki